The Declaration of State Sovereignty of Ukraine was adopted on July 16, 1990, by the recently elected parliament of Ukrainian SSR by a vote of 355 for and four against.

The document decreed that Ukrainian SSR laws took precedence over the laws of the USSR, and declared that the Ukrainian SSR would maintain its own army and its own national bank with the power to introduce its own currency. The declaration also proclaimed that the republic has intent to become in a future "a permanently neutral state that does not participate in military blocs," and that it would not accept, nor produce, nor procure nuclear weapons.

Shortly before Ukraine had done it other Soviet republics had also proclaimed their sovereignty; these being Moldavia, Russia and Uzbekistan.

The Declaration established the principles of Self-Determination of the Ukrainian Nation, Rule of the People, State Power, Citizenship of the Ukrainian SSR, Territorial Supremacy, Economic Independence, Environmental Safety, Cultural Development, External and Internal Security, and International Relations.

Also on July 16, 1990, parliament by a vote of 339 for and five against proclaimed July 16 a national holiday in Ukraine. And it created Ukrainian SSR citizenship while guaranteeing citizens the right to retain USSR citizenship, approving this by a vote of 296 for and 26 against.

Historical context 

The declaration was adopted during the collapse of the USSR. Interethnic tensions in the Asian and Caucasian republics have spilled over into bloody inter-ethnic clashes. On March 11, 1990, Lithuania declared its independence from the USSR, and Latvia and Estonia were actively preparing for the restoration of independence. On the streets of Ukrainian cities, the Ukrainian Interparty Assembly had already registered citizens of the Ukrainian People's Republic.

During the only referendum in the history of the USSR (All-Union Referendum on the Preservation of the USSR), which took place on March 17, 1990, with the assistance of the Government of the Ukrainian SSR, a republican consultative poll was held in Ukraine at the insistence of the People's Movement for Perestroika as part of the Union of Sovereign Republics on the basis of the Declaration of Sovereignty of Ukraine."

More than 80% of respondents answered positively.

The word "socialism", which is critical for the CPSU, "dropped" from the text of the Ukrainian question.

Secondly, the question sounded like a completely different union state - not the Union of Soviet Socialists, but the Union of Sovereign Republics.

Third, the Declaration of Sovereignty of Ukraine was defined as an act that took precedence over the legislation of the new union state.

Thus, the consequence of the ideological struggle of the People's Movement of Ukraine for perestroika was that the referendum and poll in Ukraine legitimized at least two (and with Gorbachev's wish - three) completely different forms of union state and took a step towards independence - commitment to the republican government, develop and adopt the Declaration of Sovereignty of Ukraine.

Under pressure from public sentiment, the XXVIII Congress of the Communist Party adopted a resolution "On the State Sovereignty of the Ukrainian SSR" (June 1990). As the majority in the Verkhovna Rada of the Ukrainian SSR were Communists, the deputies of the Verkhovna Rada of the Ukrainian SSR adopted the Declaration in pursuance of the resolution of the Congress.

See also
Declaration of Independence of Ukraine
1991 Ukrainian sovereignty referendum
Declaration of State Sovereignty of the Russian Soviet Federative Socialist Republic
Nuclear weapons and Ukraine

References

External links
  - Verkhovna Rada website
 Declaration of State Sovereignty of Ukraine - Verkhovna Rada website

Political history of Ukraine
Government of Ukraine
Politics of Ukraine
1990 in law
1990 in Ukraine
1990 documents
1990 in the Soviet Union
1990 in international relations
Dissolution of the Soviet Union
July 1990 events in Europe